Love Story  or A Love Story may refer to:

Arts, entertainment, and media

Genres
 Romance (love)
 Romance film
 Romance novel

Films
 Love Story (1925 film), German silent film
 Love Story (1942 film), Italian drama film
 Love Story (1943 film), French film
 Love Story (1944 film), British film
 Love Story (1970 film), American romantic drama film based on Erich Segal's novel
 Love Story (1981 film), Indian Hindi-language romance film
 Love Story (1986 film), Indian Malayalam-language film
 Love Story (2006 film), British documentary film about the band Love
 Love Story (2008 film), Indian Bengali-language romance directed by Raj Mukherjee
 Love Story (2011 Indonesian film), Indonesian film
 Love Story (2011 New Zealand film), New Zealand film
 Love Story (2012 film), Maldivian film 
 Love Story (2013 film), Chinese romantic comedy film
 Love Story (2020 film), Indian Bengali-language film
 Love Story (2021 film), Indian Telugu-language film
 A Love Story (1933 film), French historical drama film
 A Love Story (1954 film), a German drama film
 A Love Story (2007 film), Filipino drama film
 A Love Story (2016 film), British animated short film
 Greeku Veerudu, Indian Telugu-language film being dubbed into Tamil as Love Story
 Love Stories, 1997 Polish film

Literature
 Love Story (novel), a 1970 romance novel by Erich Segal
 Love Story, a 1933 play by S. N. Behrman

Music

Albums and EPs
 Love Story (Tony Bennett album), 1971
 Love Story (Johnny Mathis album), 1971
 Love Story (Andy Williams album), 1971
 Love Story (Andy Williams album, UK version), 1971
 Love Story (Yelawolf album), 2015
 Love Story, a 1995 album by Lloyd Cole
 Love Story, a 2014 album by Tim McGraw
 Love Story, a 2007 album by Hayami Show
 Love Story, a 1968 EP by Usha Uthup
 Love Story, a 1987 album by Deric Wan
 A Love Story (Vivian Green album), 2002
A Love Story (Des'ree album), 2019
 A Love Story, a 2019 album by Des'ree
 Love Stories (album), a 2019 album by Eliane Elias
 Love Stories, a 1998 album by ABBA

Songs
 "(Where Do I Begin?) Love Story", the theme from the 1970 film Love Story
 "Love Story" (Nadia Ali song), 2009
 "Love Story" (Jethro Tull song), 1968
 "Love Story" (Melody song), 2007
 "Love Story" (Taylor Swift song), 2008
 "Love Story (vs. Finally)", by Layo & Bushwacka!
 "Love Story", by Mariah Carey from E=MC²
 "Love Story", by Rain from Rainism
 "Love Story", by Indila from Mini World
 "Love Story", by Katharine McPhee from Katharine McPhee, 2007
 "Love Story", by NEWS, 2019
 "Love Story (You and Me)", by Randy Newman from Randy Newman

Television

Series
 Love Story (1954 TV series), a 1954 American program that aired on the DuMont Television Network
 Love Story (1973 TV series), a 1973 American anthology series that aired on NBC
 Love Story (Indian TV series), a 2007 Indian serial aired on SAB TV
 Love Story (British TV series), a British anthology series that aired 1963 to 1974
 Love Story, a TVB serial aired on TVB Jade from 1968 to 1969

Episodes
 "Love Story" (M*A*S*H), a 1973 episode title
 Love Story, 1952 Hallmark Hall of Fame episode

Other uses in arts, entertainment, and media
 Love Story (musical), a 2010 stage musical inspired by the novel
 Love Story (video game), a 2000 Japanese full motion game for the PlayStation 2
 Love Story (webcomic), webtoon by Kang Full
 Love Story Magazine, an American romantic fiction pulp magazine, published from 1921 to 1947 and from 1952 to 1954

See also
 Love (2008 Bengali film), an Indian Bengali film based on Erich Segal's novel
 Romance (love)